Chad Holbrook (born January 14, 1971) is an American baseball coach, who is the current head baseball coach of the College of Charleston Cougars. Prior to becoming head coach for the Cougars, Holbrook was head coach at the University of South Carolina, and an assistant for both the University of North Carolina and the University of South Carolina.

Playing career
Holbrook attended the University of North Carolina in Chapel Hill from 1990 to 1993, receiving second-team All-ACC honors as a senior. He graduated in 1994 with a degree in physical education. In 1992, he played collegiate summer baseball for the Chatham A's of the Cape Cod Baseball League.

Coaching career

North Carolina
At the conclusion of his playing career, Holbrook served as an undergraduate assistant coach for the 1994 season before being promoted to Assistant Coach in 1995 and Associate Head Coach in 2007. In 1997, he managed the Harwich Mariners, a collegiate summer baseball team in the prestigious Cape Cod Baseball League. In his 15 seasons on the Tar Heel coaching staff, North Carolina made 11 NCAA tournament appearances and three College World Series appearances.

South Carolina
After the 2008 season, Holbrook left North Carolina to become the Associate Head Coach at South Carolina. In Holbrook's time as Associate Head Coach, South Carolina won back-to-back national championships in 2010 and 2011 and finished as the national runner-up in 2012. In 2011, ESPN the Magazine named Holbrook the 10th best recruiter in all of college athletics. After the 2011 season, Holbrook was named Assistant Coach of the Year by 2011 Assistant Coach of the Year by the ABCA and Baseball America.

Holbrook became head coach after Ray Tanner became the athletic director at South Carolina following the 2012 season. In his first season as head coach, Holbrook and the Gamecocks finished with a 43–20 overall record and finished second in the SEC Eastern division with a 17–12 record in conference play. The Gamecocks hosted and won the Columbia Regional. However, the team lost two out of three games to the North Carolina Tar Heels in the NCAA Super Regionals.

College of Charleston 
On July 20, 2017, it was announced that Holbrook was hired as the head coach at the College of Charleston.

Personal
Holbrook's father, Eddie Holbrook, was the head basketball coach at Gardner–Webb University and Furman University. Holbrook and his wife, Jennifer, have two sons, Reece and Cooper. Holbrook's oldest son, Reece, recently committed to The University of North Carolina Chapel Hill baseball team.

Head coaching record

See also

List of current NCAA Division I baseball coaches

References

External links
 South Carolina profile

Living people
Cape Cod Baseball League coaches
College of Charleston Cougars baseball coaches
North Carolina Tar Heels baseball players
Chatham Anglers players
North Carolina Tar Heels baseball coaches
South Carolina Gamecocks baseball coaches
1971 births